These are the Washington Huskies football annual team award recipients.

Season awards

References

College football annual team awards by team
Awards
Washington (state) sports-related lists
Seattle-related lists